Five Guys Enterprises, LLC (doing business as both Five Guys Burgers and Fries, and simply Five Guys) is an American fast food  restaurant chain focused on hamburgers, hot dogs, and french fries, and headquartered in Lorton, Virginia, part of Fairfax County. The first Five Guys restaurant opened in 1986 in Arlington County, Virginia, and by 2001, the chain had expanded to five locations throughout the Washington, D.C. metro area.

In early 2003, the chain began franchising, beginning a period of rapid expansion. In a year and a half, permits had been sold for over 300 franchised locations. , Five Guys had over 1,700 locations open worldwide, with 1,300 locations under development. The company was the fastest-growing fast food chain in the United States, with a 32.8% sales increase from 2010 to 2011.

History
Five Guys was founded in 1986 by Janie and Jerry Murrell; Jerry, alongside the couple's four sons, Jim, Matt, Chad, and Ben, were the original "Five Guys." The Murrells had a fifth son, Tyler, two years later. Today, all five sons, the current "Five Guys", are involved in the business: Matt and Jim travel the country visiting stores, Chad oversees training, Ben selects the franchisees, and Tyler runs the bakery. The first Five Guys was in Arlington's Westmont Shopping Center. Buns were baked in the same center by Brenner's Bakery. This location closed, in favor of another in Alexandria, Virginia, at the intersection of King and North Beauregard Streets, which closed on September 21, 2013.

More followed in Old Town Alexandria and Springfield, Virginia, making five locations open by 2001. Their success encouraged the Murrells to franchise their concept the following year, engaging Fransmart, a franchise sales organization. Former American football player Mark Moseley, who had gone to work for Fransmart after his football career, played a key role in Five Guys' expansion and went on to become the company's director of franchise development after it ended its business relationship with Fransmart. In early 2003, the chain began franchising, opening the doors to rapid expansion which caught the attention of national restaurant trade organizations and the national press. The expansion started in Virginia and Maryland, and by the end of 2004, over 300 units were in development through the Northeast. Over the next few years, the chain rapidly expanded across the entire United States and into Canada, reaching over 1,000 locations by 2012.

The first location outside North America opened in the United Kingdom in July 2013, in London on Long Acre in Covent Garden. The chain now has more than 150 restaurants in the UK. Five Guys also has locations in the Middle East and has continued to expand in Europe. In late 2017, Five Guys opened its first restaurants in Germany, with a branch in Frankfurt and another in Essen.

Five Guys Enterprises has several affiliated companies that are not part of a consolidated group, but are under common ownership. Five Guys Operations was founded in 2012, Five Guys Holdings was founded in 2007. Five Guys Foods UK Limited was incorporated on March 12, 2013. FGE International, FGO International BV, and FG Coöperatief U.A. are based in Amsterdam. FGH International C.V. is located in Bermuda.

The company has a  headquarters in Lorton, Virginia, overlooking the Occoquan and Potomac Rivers, that was specially designed to convey the corporate brand. According to the architect, "The lobby mimics the typical Five Guys restaurant with red and white tile, tall tables, Freestyle Coke machine and signature peanut boxes."

On September 24, 2020, the first Five Guys location with a drive-through window opened in Surfside Beach, South Carolina. The franchisee retained it from the former business in the building in light of COVID-19 pandemic safe practices.

In September 2021, Five Guys opened their first location in Australia. The chain also has plans to expand into New Zealand.

In November 2022, Five Guys announced the relocation of their corporate headquarters to the Carlyle neighborhood of Alexandria, Virginia.

Menu 

The Five Guys menu is centered on hamburgers offered with Kraft American cheese or applewood-smoked bacon and kosher style hot dogs (Hebrew National all-beef franks), as well as grilled cheese, BLT and vegetable sandwiches. Five Guys uses buns that are sweeter and "eggier" than normal buns. The hamburgers come in two sizes: regular (two patties) and little (one patty). Fresh-cut french fries are the sole side item, available salted only in "Five Guys style" or seasoned "Cajun style". Customers may select from 15 different toppings at no charge to customize their meals.

Complimentary roasted in-shell peanuts are offered for on-site consumption at most locations, with signage alerting potential customers who may have a peanut allergy; for these allergen reasons, customers are not allowed to take peanuts off-site.

The chain also sells milkshakes in the traditional vanilla, chocolate, and strawberry flavors, and can also be ordered with the customer's choice of up to 10 free toppings mixed in, ranging from Oreo cookies to bacon.

The company experimented with offering coffee, but this was discontinued due to quality concerns. Like other breakfast items, such as the BLT sandwich and bacon, egg and cheese sandwich, coffee is currently only offered in Five Guys's airport locations and its location near McPherson Square station.

Restaurants

Bags of potatoes are sometimes stacked in customer spaces due to an occasional lack of storage space, or, in some franchises, for aesthetic reasons. Restaurants are decorated with white and red checkered tile throughout and generally use wooden tables along with counter-high level seating.

Reception

Five Guys has received numerous awards in D.C. area publications, including "Number 1 Burger" by Washingtonian Magazine for seven years. Former US President Barack Obama is reportedly a fan, buying lunch for himself and his colleagues at the Washington Five Guys branch in 2011.

Since franchising, it has also received awards in other cities.

The chain has something of a cult following and remarkable brand loyalty. Five Guys has been rated one of the most talked-about burger brands online.

As Five Guys continues to expand into the US West Coast, comparisons have been made with In-N-Out Burger, another generally similar fast food chain. Comparing the two chains in 2011, the Los Angeles Times noted that Five Guys' menu items are generally more expensive than In-N-Out's, they lack drive-throughs that In-N-Out is famous for, and are most often found inside shopping malls. The newspaper still conceded that by pricing its products higher, offering bigger burgers and building larger dining rooms, Five Guys could capitalize on the recent trend of mid-level places that offer more expensive products than fast food but cheaper than fancy restaurants.

In 2011, Five Guys was ranked first in "Fast Food - Large Chains" and "Best Burger" in Zagat's annual Fast Food Survey.

In 2012, Market Force Information, Inc. polled 7,600 fast-food consumers, and Five Guys ranked No. 1 in food quality and taste, service, cleanliness, and atmosphere.

In 2016, Five Guys was ranked first in the burger, steak, chicken and grill category of a Market Force UK survey.

References

External links

 Five Guys US
 Five Guys UK

Restaurants established in 1986
Fast-food hamburger restaurants
Fast-food chains of the United States
Fast-food franchises
Restaurants in Virginia
1986 establishments in Virginia
Fast casual restaurants
Restaurant chains in the United States
Companies based in Fairfax County, Virginia